At the Village Vanguard (subtitled You Took the Words Right Out of My Heart) is a live album by jazz drummer Paul Motian recorded at the Village Vanguard and originally released on the German JMT label. Recorded in 1995 it features performances by Motian with guitarist Bill Frisell and tenor saxophonist Joe Lovano. The album was rereleased on the Winter & Winter label in 2005.

Reception
The Allmusic review by Thom Jurek awarded the album 3½ stars, stating: "This is a prime Motian date, not to be missed this time around".

Track listing
All compositions by Paul Motian except as indicated
 "You Took the Words Right Out of My Heart" (Ralph Rainger, Leo Robin) - 7:58 
 "Abacus" - 9:38 
 "Folk Song for Rosie" - 10:19 
 "The Owl of Cranston" - 8:30 
 "5 Miles to Wrentham" - 4:46 
 "Yahllah" - 14:16 
 "The Sunflower" - 8:33 
 "Circle Dance" - 5:04
Recorded at the Village Vanguard in New York City in June 1995

Personnel
Paul Motian - drums
Bill Frisell - electric guitar
Joe Lovano - tenor saxophone

References 

1995 live albums
Paul Motian live albums
JMT Records live albums
Winter & Winter Records live albums
Albums recorded at the Village Vanguard